Nasser Khamis Abdullah Hassan (born 20 December 1987) is an Emarati footballer who plays as a striker .

External links
 Nasser Statistics At Goalzz.com

References

1987 births
Living people
Place of birth missing (living people)
Emirati footballers
Al Ain FC players
Al-Shaab CSC players
Dubai CSC players
Al Dhaid SC players
Masfout Club players
Hatta Club players
Ajman Club players
Al Urooba Club players
UAE First Division League players
UAE Pro League players
Association football forwards